Katia Lova (1914–1994) was a Bulgarian-born French film actress. Half-Bulgarian and half-Swiss, she settled in France in the early 1920s.

Selected filmography
 Aces of the Turf (1932)
 Night in May (1934)
 Turandot, Princess of China (1935)
 Claudine at School (1937)
 Les nouveaux riches (1938)
 The Rebel (1938)
 Mélodie pour toi (1942)
 Le brigand gentilhomme (1943)
 The Dancer of Marrakesh (1947)

References

Bibliography
 Goble, Alan. The Complete Index to Literary Sources in Film. Walter de Gruyter, 1999.

External links

1914 births
1994 deaths
Bulgarian emigrants to France
French film actresses
20th-century French women